Prince Nguyễn Phúc Bửu Lộc, (22 August 1914 – 27 February 1990), was an uncle of Emperor Bảo Đại, and Prime Minister of the State of Vietnam in 1954. He was a great-great-grandson of Emperor Minh Mạng, the second emperor of the Nguyễn dynasty. Both of his great-grandfather Nguyễn Phúc Miên Trinh and grandfather Nguyễn Phúc Hường Thiết were distinguished poets during the reign of Nguyễn dynasty. He later emigrated to Paris and spent his life there until his death in 1990.

Early life 
His father is Nguyễn Phúc Ưng Tôn. Mr. Ưng Tôn is a son of Nguyễn Phúc Hường Thiết and a grandson of Tuy Lý Vương Nguyễn Phúc Miên Trinh (the 11th son of Emperor Minh Mạng). Thus, he is a great-great-grandson of Emperor Minh Mạng, or a grandson of his fifth generation, calling Emperor Minh Mạng great-great-grandfather. He is an uncle of Emperor Bảo Đại. He and doctor Phạm Ngọc Thạch are cousins.

In his youth, he attended high school in Lycée Albert-Sarraut, Hanoi and later studied Law at the University of Montpellier.

Career 
He was Bảo Đại's Chief of Staff in 1948, then appointed the special representative of the State of Vietnam to the United Nations General Assembly.

In April 1949, he re-affirmed Vietnam's sovereignty over the Paracel Islands.

In 1951, he was the president of the Royal Society in Paris and the High Representative of Vietnam in France. 

Later, Chief of State Bảo Đại appointed him Minister of the Interior of the State of Vietnam. On 17 December 1953, when Prime Minister Nguyễn Văn Tâm submitted his resignation, Bửu Lộc was assigned to form a new cabinet. On 11 January 1954, Bảo Đại issued Decree No. 4/CP approving the new cabinet list. Prince Bửu Lộc then served as Prime Minister from 11 January to 16 June 1954. He resigned and was succeeded by Ngô Đình Diệm.

Family 
In 1958, he married a French woman named Pacteau. They have only one son, Jean-François Nguyễn Phúc Vĩnh Lộc (born on 18 October 1959).

He passed away in 1990 in Paris, aged 75.

References

Nguyen dynasty princes
Prime Ministers of South Vietnam
Vietnamese exiles
1914 births
1990 deaths
Vietnamese emigrants to France